The 1982 Winnipeg Blue Bombers finished in 2nd place in the West Division with an 11–5 record. They appeared in the West Final but lost 24–21 to the Edmonton Eskimos.

Offseason

CFL Draft

Preseason

Regular season

Standings

Schedule

Playoffs

West Semi-Final

West Final

Awards

1982 CFL All-Stars

References

Winnipeg Blue Bombers seasons
1982 Canadian Football League season by team